Marco Antonio Morgon Filho (born 24 February 1988), known as Marquinho, is a Brazilian professional footballer who plays as a midfielder for Santa Maria.

Career 
Marco Morgon started his career in the lower categories of Corinthians, where he played for five years. After that, he had a chance to show his work in América Futebol Clube, becoming the top scorer in the Junior Tournament. In 2007, he was ceded to Boa Esporte (known as VEC at the time), where he debuted as a professional and emerged as a great promise.

In 2008, the athlete played for Atlétio de Valdevez, 2B Division. Then, joined G.D. Moreira do Lima, a Portuguese Third Division team, becoming a scorer.

In 2010, Morgon played for Coruxo F.C., a Spanish 2B Division football club, playing for one season. After that, he was transferred to Céltiga F.C., making it into the 2nd Division.

In 2012, he signed for Deportivo San Pedro, finishing as a top scorer with 14 goals. This caught the eyes of National League teams, such as Comunicaciones and Municipal. Morgon signed, in 2013, for Deportivo Mictlán, in Asunción Mita. In the Guatemalan club, he had a successful tournament and was rated the Best Assist Maker in the league, with 10 assists.

In 2014, the footballer signed for San Marcos de Arica, which was the champion of the First Division B.

From 2015 until 2016, he played for Alianza Petrolera F.C. in Colombia.

In 2017, Morgon played for Brasília F.C., scoring 2 goals in a friendly match against Cruzeiro E.C., whose managers showed interest in signing Morgon.

Also in 2017, Morgon decided it was time for a change, signing for Desportiva Ferroviária, introducing himself to the supporters.

At the end of 2017, he played for the Premier League team Hibernians F.C. His skills impressed the First Division club Ghajnsielem F.C., which signed him for the 2017/2018 season. The footballer scored 11 goals in league matches and 3 during the Gozo Cups. In July 2018, First Division team Sirens F.C. signed Morgon, and the athlete helped the club to get promoted to the Maltese Premier League, scoring 11 goals and assisting in another 13.

In 2019, Morgon played as a midfielder for San José de Oruro. In 2020, when competing for the Copa Libertadores, Marco Morgon delivered a brilliant performance, according to the Bolivian Fox Sports commentators.

Morgon is growing in popularity in the Latin American country San José and, alongside his teammates, went back to the fields in November 2020.

The match against Real Santa Cruz was highly successful for the team after a long period of unlicensed training. Marco scored 2 goals, setting up the winning at 4-1.

In January 2021, Morgon signed for KF Bylis, an Albanian football club competing in the Kategoria Superiore in the Eastern European country.

After playing for Bylis, in Albania, Marco Morgon signed for Gran Mamoré in 2021/2, which is currently competing on the División de Fútbol Profesional in Bolivia.

At the end of 2021, Morgon signed with Sololá, competing on Guatemala’s Liga Nacional.

Morgon’s great performance caught the attention of Manurewa AFC, a football club based in Auckland, New Zealand. The player is now the number 11 of the team, playing as a left winger. In January 2023, Marco signed for Santa Maria, playing as a left-winger.

Statistics
(Correct )

The Maltese First Division football club, Sirens F.C., had a good 18/19 season. They won 18 out of 26 matches. The Blues were declared champions of the BOV First Division after a goalless draw with Vittoriosa Stars F.C. on April 20. Their promotion to Premier League came earlier in April, and Marco Morgon used his Facebook to thank everyone involved in this historical moment, receiving tons of replies from the supporters and fans across Europe and Latin America.

Clubs

(Correct )

Honours
Noroeste Bauru, São Paulo
Champion at Campeonato Paulista do Interior in 2004 playing for Esporte Clube Noroeste
Mogi das Cruzes, São Paulo
Champion at Campeonato Paulista Juniores in 2007 playing for União Futebol Clube
América, Minas Gerais
Champion at Campeonato Mineiro Juvenil in 2008 playing for América Futebol Clube
Viana do Castelo, Portugal
Top Scorer in 2008 playing for Atlético de Valdevez
Moreira do Lima, Portugal
Viana do Castelo Honour Division in 2009 playing for GD Moreira de Lima
Moreira do Lima, Portugal
Second-highest goal scorer in 2009 playing GD Moreira de Lima
Galicia, Spain
Champion and promoted to 2nd League in 2010 playing for Céltiga FC
San Marcos, Guatemala
Top Scorer in 2012 playing for Deportivo San Pedro
Arica, Chile
Chilean First B Division Champion and promoted to Premier League in 2014 playing for San Marcos de Arica
San Pawl il-Baħar, Malta
Maltese First Division Champion and promoted to Premier League in 2019 playing for Sirens F.C.

References

1988 births
Living people
People from Santo André, São Paulo
Brazilian footballers
Association football midfielders
Brazilian expatriate footballers
Expatriate footballers in Portugal
Expatriate footballers in Spain
Expatriate footballers in Guatemala
Expatriate footballers in Chile
Expatriate footballers in Colombia
Expatriate footballers in Malta
Expatriate footballers in Bolivia
Expatriate footballers in Albania
Expatriate association footballers in New Zealand
Sirens F.C. players
Għajnsielem F.C. players
Hibernians F.C. players
Desportiva Ferroviária players
Brasília Futebol Clube players
Alianza Petrolera players
Deportivo San Pedro players
San Marcos de Arica footballers
Cobán Imperial players
Deportivo Mictlán players
Club San José players
Bolivian Primera División
Kategoria Superiore
Primera B de Chile
Brazilian expatriate sportspeople in Portugal
Brazilian expatriate sportspeople in Spain
Brazilian expatriate sportspeople in Guatemala
Brazilian expatriate sportspeople in Chile
Brazilian expatriate sportspeople in Colombia
Brazilian expatriate sportspeople in Malta
Brazilian expatriate sportspeople in Bolivia
Brazilian expatriate sportspeople in Albania
Brazilian expatriate sportspeople in New Zealand